Giovanni Bonagrazia (born in 1654) was an Italian painter, active in Treviso in a Mannerist style.

Biography
He was a pupil of Antonio Zanchi, and active until late 17th-century.

For church of Sant'Agostino in Treviso, he painted canvases with an Annunciation, St John Baptist, St Jerome, the Archangel Gabriel, St Sebastian, and Mary Magdalen. He also painted a God the Father and Angels on an altar tabernacle in the chapel of the Crucifix in the church of San Gaetano in Padua.

References

1654 births
Year of death unknown
17th-century Italian painters
Italian male painters
Italian Mannerist painters